The Oketz Unit (lit. sting), is the independent canine special forces (sayeret) unit of the Israel Defense Forces.

History
It was founded in 1939 as part of Haganah, and later dismantled in 1954. In 1974, a new unit was established by Yossi Labock, who was its first commander. The unit specializes in training and handling dogs for military applications. Originally, Oketz trained dogs to attack kidnappers, but training has since become more specialized, and now each dog is trained in a particular specialty. Attack dogs are trained to operate in both urban and rural areas (they were used extensively in Lebanon). Some dogs are trained to track and pursue selected targets for manhunts and to detect breaches at the Israeli border. Others are trained to search for guns and munitions, to sniff out hidden explosives, and to find people in collapsed buildings. 

Oketz operators are often assigned to other units when said units are in need of their specialist skills, for instance, the extraction of terrorists from fortified buildings. Though not affiliated with the IDF Paratroopers Brigade, Oketz operators wear the same distinctive red berets and the unit's graduation ceremony is held at the Paratroopers headquarters. However, in order to join Oketz, the recruit must choose the Kfir Infantry Brigade as their preferred choice in the request form and then pass the unit's trials.

Another use for dogs were to  strap explosives to them, and then blow them up (by remote control) when they reached their target. In Operation Blue and Brown (Kachol Ve’hum)  in Lebanon, 1986 such a dog was used in the failed attempt to assassinate Ahmed Jibril. The operation, which Bergman calls "an embarrassing flop", ended with one Israeli killed, and the dog was "frighted by the shooting and ran away". The dog was later recovered by Hizbollah.

Dogs
Oketz prefers the Belgian Shepherd (Malinois), over the German Shepherd and Rottweiler, which were formerly employed by the unit. The reasons for this preference are twofold: one, the Malinois is large enough to effectively attack an enemy while still being small enough to be picked up by its handler, and two, their coats are short and typically of a neutral to fair color, making them less prone to heatstroke.

Previously, Canaan dogs were used by the unit, but had to be retired since they were too stubborn.

See also
 Police dog
 War dog

References

External links

Oketz - The Crack Canine Unit YouTube video about Oketz - The Crack Canine Unit
Israeli army's dogs to get new home, upscale cemetery article by IsraelInsider daily newsmagazine about new home for Israeli army's dogs
Kidnap Attempt of an IDF Soldier Thwarted article about thwarted kidnap attempt of an IDF soldier -  A dog from the IDF Oketz canine unit is killed 
Another bomb-sniffing dog dies during duty article by AR-News, written by Arene Fine, Staff Reporter, about Toska, an Israeli bomb-sniffing dog who died in battle
St.-Sgt. Nadav Kudinski Article published by Israel Ministry of Foreign Affairs, about Staff-Sergeant Nadav Kudinski of the IDF Oketz canine unit, who, along with his dog, was killed by a bomb.
Israel's Dogs of War
From Rudolphina Menzel to Unit "Oketz" – Dogs on Top, exhibition in the IDF&defense establishment archives

Special forces of Israel
Working dogs
Military units and formations established in 1974